James Carmichael may refer to:

James Wilson Carmichael (1800–1868), British marine painter, also often referred to as John Wilson Carmichael
James William Carmichael (1819–1903), Member of the Canadian House of Commons
James Carmichael (bishop) (1838–1908), Anglican Bishop of Montreal, 1906–1908
Sir James Carmichael, 3rd Baronet (1844–1902), Scottish MP for Glasgow St Rollox
Sir James Carmichael (engineer) (1868–1934), British Army officer, engineer and Crown Agent
James Carmichael (British politician) (1894–1966), Scottish Labour Member of Parliament
Jim Carmichael (1939–2016), Ohio State Representative
James Anthony Carmichael (born 1941), American music arranger and record producer
James V. Carmichael (1910–1972), American lawyer, businessman, and member of the Georgia General Assembly
James Henry Carmichael Jr. (1907–1983), American airmail pilot, airline executive
James Carmichael (minister), Church of Scotland minister and author
Jimmy Carmichael (footballer) (1894–1967), Scottish footballer

See also
Sir James Carmichael-Smyth, 1st Baronet (1779–1838), Governor of the Bahamas and British Guiana